Antonio Capuano may refer to:

 Antonio Capuano (actor) (died 1963), Argentine actor
 Antonio Capuano (director) (born 1940), Italian film director